The men's 10 metre air rifle event at the 2019 European Games in Minsk, Belarus took place on 24 June at the Shooting Centre.

Schedule
All times are  local (UTC+3).

Records

Results

Qualification

Final

References

Men's 10m air rifle